Koyanagi (written: 小柳 lit. "small willow") is a Japanese surname. Notable people with the surname include:

, Japanese actress and singer
, Japanese footballer
, Imperial Japanese Navy admiral
, Japanese diver
, Japanese ophthalmologist
, Japanese pop singer

See also
Koyanagi Station, a railway station in Aomori, Aomori Prefecture, Japan

Japanese-language surnames